Sir George St Paul, 1st Baronet (1562 – 18 October 1613) was an English politician.

He was born the son of Thomas St Paul (or Thomas St Poll) of Snarford, Lincolnshire and educated at Corpus Christi College, Oxford. He entered Lincoln's Inn in 1580. He married Frances, the daughter of Sir Christopher Wray, although they had no children.

He was appointed High Sheriff of Lincolnshire in 1588 and elected as knight of the shire (MP) for Lincolnshire in 1589 and 1593.  He was the Member of Parliament for Grimsby in 1604–1611. He was knighted in 1608, and was created a baronet in 1611.

He built Snarford Hall in Snarford, Lincolnshire.

When he died in 1613 his estate devolved upon his sister, Faith, Lady Tyrwhitt.

References
History of Parliament-ST POLL, George (1562-1613) of Melwood and Snarford, Lincs
http://findarticles.com/p/articles/mi_m0PAL/is_509_159/ai_n6153267/pg_2/

1562 births
1613 deaths
People from West Lindsey District
Members of the Parliament of England for Great Grimsby
Baronets in the Baronetage of England
High Sheriffs of Lincolnshire
English MPs 1589
English MPs 1593
English MPs 1604–1611